The 2014–15 Lehigh Mountain Hawks men's basketball team represented Lehigh University during the 2014–15 NCAA Division I men's basketball season. The Mountain Hawks, led by eighth year head coach Brett Reed, played their home games at Stabler Arena and were members of the Patriot League. They finished the season 16–14, 10–8 in Patriot League play to finish in third place. They lost in the quarterfinals of the Patriot League tournament to American.

Roster

Schedule

|-
!colspan=9 style="background:#502D0E; color:#FFFFFF;"| Non-conference regular season

|-
!colspan=9 style="background:#502D0E; color:#FFFFFF;"| Patriot League regular season

|-
!colspan=9 style="background:#502D0E; color:#FFFFFF;"| Patriot League tournament

References

Lehigh Mountain Hawks men's basketball seasons
Lehigh